Leonid Pervomayskyi (birth name: Illia Hurevych) (4/17 May 1908 – 9 December 1973), was a Jewish-Ukrainian poet, a winner of the 1946 Stalin Prize for literature and a member of the Communist party since 1954.

Pervomayskyi was born in Konstantinograd (now Krasnohrad, Kharkiv region of Ukraine) to the family of a bookbinder. He worked in a factory, then at a library and a newspaper. During 1941-1945, he was a military reporter. After the World War II, he published a novel in verse called "Brother's Youth" (Молодість брата, 1947) and numerous collections of poetry.

In 1946 he was awarded Stalin Prize of second degree for collections of poetry «День народження» ("The Birthday") and «Земля» ("The Land").  Later, he had been criticized by the Communist Party for the so-called "ideological errors".

Pervomaysky died on 9 December 1973. He was buried in Kyiv at the Baikove Cemetery.

He was a recipient of a number of military and civil decorations.

References

 Сайт письменника at Leonid Pervomajskij.net.
 Тексти Леоніда Первомайського та про нього
 К.: Головна редакція Української Радянської Енциклопедії (1981); Київ: За редакцією А. В. Кудрицкого; 736 с., іл.

Jewish Ukrainian poets
1908 births
1973 deaths
People from Krasnohrad
People from Poltava Governorate
Soviet poets
Burials at Baikove Cemetery